The 1968–69 Yale Bulldogs men's basketball team represented Yale University during the 1968–69 men's college basketball season. The Bulldogs, led by 13th year head coach Joe Vancisin, played their home games at John J. Lee Amphitheater of the Payne Whitney Gymnasium and were members of the Ivy League. They finished the season 9–16, 6–8 in Ivy League play to finish in fifth place.

Schedule

References 

Yale
Yale Bulldogs men's basketball seasons
Yale Bulldogs
Yale Bulldogs